Manole is a Romanian name, used as both a given name and a surname. People with the given name include:

 Manole Aldescu
 Manole Marcus

People with the surname include:

 Laurențiu Manole
 Leonard Manole
 Mădălina Manole
 Viorel Manole

See also 
 Meșterul Manole
 Manole River (disambiguation)
 Manolescu (surname)
 Manoleasa, a commune in Botoșani County, Romania.

Surnames
Romanian-language surnames
Romanian masculine given names